Thulium dibromide is an inorganic compound, with the chemical formula of TmBr2. It is a dark green solid that is easy to dissolve, with the SrI2 structure and it needs to be stored in an inert atmosphere.

Preparation 

Thulium dibromide can be prepared by reacting thulium with thulium tribromide at 800~900 °C in a vacuum. At high temperatures, the alkali metals can also obtain bromide, but only lithium and sodium reactions obtain thulium dibromide, and the response to the participation of potassium, rubidium, and caesium.

References 

Lanthanide halides
Thulium compounds
Bromides